The 1987 International cricket season was from April 1987 to September 1987.

Season overview

April

New Zealand in Sri Lanka

May

Pakistan in England

References

1987 in cricket